Darwin P. Hutchins (December 9, 1915 – October 9, 1985) was an American professional basketball player. He played in the National Basketball League for the Hammond Ciesar All-Americans and averaged 6.8 points per game for his career.

References 

1915 births
1985 deaths
American men's basketball players
United States Army personnel of World War II
Basketball players from Illinois
Bradley Braves men's basketball players
Centers (basketball)
Forwards (basketball)
Hammond Ciesar All-Americans players